Bill Boyle is an American head coach and a former soccer player. He holds a NSCAA's National Advanced License and USSF A Coaching License. He is the Niagara Purple Eagles men's soccer head coach since 2016.

Coach
Boyle kicked off his coaching career at his alma mater, Okemos High School, in 2001. He also coached the U-16 Real Colorado Foxes boy’s squad from 1999–2000, and served as the boys varsity head coach at Haslett High School in 2009.

He served as head coach at Division III Olivet College for four seasons, from 2005–08, before joining the Michigan State Spartans men's soccer team as an assistant coach, working with the goalkeepers as well as directing the day-to-day operations of the team and scouting opponents in 2010. Boyle served as an assistant coach at Colgate University from 2011–13, and at the University at Albany, SUNY from 2014–15, before joining Niagara University as head coach in 2016.

References

Hartwick Hawks men's soccer players
Living people
Niagara Purple Eagles men's soccer coaches
Year of birth missing (living people)
Soccer players from Michigan
Place of birth missing (living people)
Association footballers not categorized by position
American soccer coaches
People from Okemos, Michigan
Olivet Comets
Michigan State Spartans men's soccer coaches
Colgate Raiders men's soccer coaches
Albany Great Danes men's soccer coaches
Association football players not categorized by nationality